The 2013 Aberto de Tênis do Rio Grande do Sul was a professional tennis tournament played on Clay. It was the Second edition of the tournament which was part of the 2013 ATP Challenger Tour. It took place in Porto Alegre, Brazil between 23 and 29 September 2013.

Singles main draw entrants

Seeds

 1 Rankings are as of September 16, 2013.

Other entrants
The following players received wildcards into the singles main draw:
  Marcelo Demoliner
  Eduardo Dischinger
  Thiago Monteiro
  Fabrício Neis

The following players used Protected Ranking to gain entry into the singles main draw:
  Eduardo Schwank

The following players used Special Exempt to gain entry into the singles main draw:
  Bjorn Fratangelo

The following players received entry from the qualifying draw:
  Andrea Collarini
  Carlos Gómez-Herrera
  José Hernández
  Gianluigi Quinzi

Champions

Singles

 Facundo Argüello def.  Máximo González, 6–4, 6–1

Doubles

 Guillermo Durán /  Máximo González def.  Víctor Estrella /  João Souza, 3–6, 6–1, [10–5]

External links
Official Website

Aberto de Tenis do Rio Grande do Sul
Aberto de Tênis do Rio Grande do Sul
2013 in Brazilian tennis